Bradley H. Bedell (born February 12, 1977) is a former American football guard in the National Football League (NFL) and current college football coach.  He attended Mt. San Antonio College, where he played football under legendary Community College Coach Bill Fisk. He attended the University of Colorado, where he played college football.  He was drafted in the sixth round of the 2000 NFL Draft by the Cleveland Browns. Bedell also played for the Miami Dolphins, Washington Redskins, Green Bay Packers, and the Houston Texans. After serving as the offensive line coach at Boise State, Bedell followed head coach Bryan Harsin to Auburn as the tight ends coach. Auburn fired Bedell on October 31, 2022, along with Harsin, offensive coordinator Eric Kiesau, and several other staffers.

References

1977 births
Living people
Colorado Buffaloes football players
Green Bay Packers players
Houston Texans players
Miami Dolphins players
Washington Redskins players
People from Arcadia, California
Players of American football from California
Sportspeople from Los Angeles County, California